The Cretan owl (Athene cretensis) is an extinct species of owl from the Pleistocene of the island of Crete, in the eastern Mediterranean. It was first named by Weesie in 1982. In life, it would have been at least 60 cm tall, and flightless or nearly flightless. The Cretan owl became extinct after humans moved into Crete.

References

 Faunal Extinction in an Island Society – Pygmy Hippopotamus Hunters of Cyprus (Interdisciplinary Contributions to Archaeology) by Alan H. Simmons and G.A. Clarke (Pg.176)
 

Athene (bird)
Quaternary birds of Europe
Prehistoric Crete
Fossil taxa described in 1982